The Yanks Air Museum is a non-profit 501 (c)(3) organization and museum dedicated to exhibiting, preserving and restoring American aircraft and artifacts in order to show the evolution of American aviation, located at Chino Airport in Chino, California.

Chino facility and exhibits
Yanks Air Museum houses one of the largest and most historically significant collections of American aircraft including the World War II fighters, dive and torpedo bombers. The aircraft collection begins with the 1903 Wright Flyer (only replica in collection) and continues through the 1980s era represented by the F-15 Eagle, F-16 Fighting Falcon and Blue Angels F/A-18 Hornet. The collection exceeds 190 aircraft, with some being the last survivors of their type. Yanks restores all aircraft to airworthy condition, and in the restoration of these rare aircraft only original factory specifications and materials are used.

In addition to the display hangars, public access is permitted, on a supervised basis, to the main restoration hangar and boneyard where historic aircraft are in various stages of restoration. Some of the aircraft will not be flown due to their rarity, but are restored to fully airworthy condition.

Greenfield project
Work is now underway to create a second Yanks Air Museum facility in Greenfield, California. The facility will include , the campus will be centered on the new  museum facility. An active airport will support both museum flight operations and the private aviation needs of museum visitors and local aviators. Other features include an advanced-technology education center, a hotel and spa, winery, restaurants, service facilities, shops and a recreational vehicle park.

Aircraft collection
A total of 190 aircraft are displayed, covering the period from 1903 through 1984 including the Inter-War period that includes the Ryan Brougham, American Eagle A-101 and Swallow TP.

Rare types on display from World War II include the P-51A Mustang, Curtiss P-40 Warhawk, Lockheed P-38 Lightning, P-47M Thunderbolt, North American B-25 Mitchell, Douglas SBD Dauntless, Curtiss SB2C Helldiver and Grumman F6F Hellcat. Many of them were built in Southern California.

Aircraft collection

Aeronca C-2 Sport
Aeronca C-3
Aeronca K Scout
Aeronca 65CA Super Chief
American Eagle A-101
Beechcraft D-17S Staggerwing (UC-43)
Beechcraft Bonanza
Bell AH-1F Cobra
Bell OH-13E Sioux
Bell P-39N Airacobra
Bell P-63A Kingcobra
Bell UH-1H Huey
Bellanca 300-A Viking
Boeing B-52F Stratofortress (cockpit section only)
Brunner Winkle Bird BK
Canadian Home Rotors Safari
Canadair Sabre 6 (N/A F-86E)
Canadair Sabre 6 (N/A F-86F)
Cessna 172A Skyhawk
Cessna AW
Cessna T-37 Tweet
Cessna T-50 Bobcat (UC-78)
Chotia Gypsy
Command-Aire 3C3
Consolidated PB4Y-2 Privateer (Navy version of the B-24 Liberator)
Convair C-131 Samaritan (R4Y-1)
Convair F-106B Delta Dart
Curtiss JN-4D Jenny
Curtiss JNS Jenny
Curtiss C-1 Robin
Curtiss C-2 Robin
Curtiss C-46F Commando
Curtiss CW-1 Junior
Curtiss O-52 Owl
Curtiss P-40E Warhawk
Curtiss SB2C-3 Helldiver
Douglas A-4A Skyhawk
Douglas A-4C Skyhawk
Douglas A-4E Skyhawk
Douglas AD-4N Skyraider
Douglas C-47A Skytrain
Douglas KA-3B Skywarrior
Douglas SBD-4 Dauntless
Ercoupe 415-D
Fairchild C-123K Provider
Fairchild PT-26 Cornell
Fieseler 103 V-1 Rocket
Fleet 7B Fawn
General Dynamics F-16B Fighting Falcon
General Dynamics F-111D Aardvark
Grumman A-6E Intruder
Grumman E-2C Hawkeye
Grumman F-11F Tiger
Grumman F-14A Tomcat
Grumman F6F-3 Hellcat
Grumman F6F-5 Hellcat
Grumman F9F-2 Panther
Grumman F9F-6 Panther
Grumman F9F-8P Cougar
Grumman FM-2 Wildcat
Grumman G-21A Goose
Grumman G-44 Widgeon
Grumman HU-16B Albatross
Grumman TBF-1C Avenger
Hawker P.1101 Hunter T-7
Hawker Siddeley GR.3 Harrier
Kellett KD-1 Autogyro
Kreider-Reisner C-2 Challenger
Learjet 23
Lockheed EC-121T Super Constellation
Lockheed F-5G Lightning
Lockheed F-80C Shooting Star
Lockheed F-104A Starfighter
Lockheed F-104C Starfighter
Lockheed T-33A
Lockheed UC-40D Electra Junior
LTV A-7B Corsair II
Martin 4-0-4 (cockpit section)
McCulloch HUM-1 (MC-4A)
McDonnell Douglas F-15A Eagle
McDonnell Douglas F-4C Phantom II
McDonnell Douglas F-4J/S Phantom II
McDonnell Douglas F/A-18 Hornet
McDonnell Douglas F/A-18 Hornet (cockpit section)
Moth Aircraft DH.60GMW Gipsy Moth
Noorduyn Norseman
Naval Aircraft Factory N3N-3
North American B-25J Mitchell
North American F-100C Super Sabre
North American FJ-1 Fury
North American P-51A Mustang
North American P-51D Mustang
North American T-6D/SNJ-5 Texan
Northrop T-38A Talon
Northrop F-5 Tiger II
Piasecki HUP-3 Retriever
Porterfield 35-70 Flyabout
Republic F-84E Thunderjet
Republic F-84F Thunderstreak
Republic F-105D Thunderchief
Republic P-47D Thunderbolt
Republic YP-47M Thunderbolt
Ryan B-1 Brougham
Schultz ABC
Schweizer SGS 2-12
Sikorsky CH-3E
Sikorsky HH-52A Seaguard
Sikorsky R-4B Hoverfly
Sikorsky S-58B
Standard J-1
Stearman 4D
Stearman YPT-9B Cloudboy
Stinson L-5E Sentinel
Swallow TP
Taylor J-2 Cub
Thomas-Morse S-4C Scout
Travel Air 2000
Vickers PBY-5 Super Catalina
Vought F4U-4 Corsair
Vought OS2U-3 Kingfisher
Vultee BT-13B Valiant
Waco 10 GXE
Waco CG-4A Hadrian
Waco UEC
Wright Flyer (replica)
Yokosuka MXY-7 Ohka 11

See also
Planes of Fame Air Museum, another air museum located at Chino Airport.
List of aerospace museums

References

Notes

Bibliography

 Ogden, Bob. Aviation Museums & Collections of North America. London: Air-Britain, 2007. .
 Parker, Dana T. Building Victory: Aircraft Manufacturing in the Los Angeles Area in World War II. Cypress, California: Dana T. Parker Books, 2013. .

External links

Yanks Air Museum

Aerospace museums in California
Chino, California
Museums in San Bernardino County, California
Military and war museums in California